= Scolobates =

Scientific classification
- Domain: Eukaryota
- Kingdom: Animalia
- Phylum: Arthropoda
- Class: Insecta
- Order: Hymenoptera
- Family: Ichneumonidae
- Genus: Scolobates; Gravenhorst, 1829

Genus of insects

Scolobates is a genus of parasitoid wasps belonging to the family Ichneumonidae.

The species of this genus are found in Europe and Northern America.

Species:

- Scolobates auriculatus (Fabricius, 1804)
- Scolobates fennicus Schmiedeknecht, 1912
